Jackson T. Katz (born May 7, 1960) is an American educator, filmmaker, and author. He has created a gender violence prevention and education program entitled 'Mentors in Violence Prevention', which is used by U.S. military and various sporting organizations.

Katz's work centers on violence, media, and masculinities, with an added focus on media literacy. He has made several documentaries on the representation of men and women in media.

Background
Katz is a former high school football player from Swampscott, Massachusetts. The first man to minor in women's studies at the University of Massachusetts-Amherst, Katz holds a master's degree from the Harvard Graduate School of Education, and a Ph.D. in cultural studies and education from UCLA, where he studied with Douglas Kellner. He has collaborated with Jean Kilbourne, Sut Jhally, and Byron Hurt.

Work
From 1988 to 1998, Katz oversaw Real Men, a grass-roots organization against sexism in Boston.

Katz co-founded Mentors in Violence Prevention (MVP) in 1993 at Northeastern University's Center for the Study of Sport in Society. MVP has been implemented by college athletic programs, professional teams (including the New England Patriots and Boston Red Sox), NASCAR, and the United States Marine Corps.  The related MVP Strategies 1997, distributes gender violence prevention training materials to U.S. school districts, municipalities, human service programs, corporations, law enforcement agencies, and military services.  Katz has personally lectured at many such organizations as well, and has appeared on "Good Morning America," "The Oprah Winfrey Show" and "ABC News 20/20." His consultative role ranges has ranged from the World Health Organization to The Liz Claiborne Company. In March 2000, Secretary of Defense William S. Cohen appointed him to the U.S. Secretary of Defense's Task Force on Domestic Violence in the Military, where he served from 2000-2003.

Katz currently is a paid consultant to the U.S. Air Force bystander intervention training and also acts as director of the first global gender violence prevention program in the U.S. Marine Corps.  Katz and his colleagues have also conducted trainings for the U.S. Army in Iraq, and MVP has been piloted around the world by the U.S. Navy.

Key ideas

Bystander approach
Katz advocates the bystander approach to gender violence and bullying prevention. Instead of focusing on women as victims and men as perpetrators of harassment, abuse or violence, the bystander approach concentrates on the role of peers in schools, groups, teams, workplaces and other social units.

In 2009, after an alleged gang rape in Richmond, California where two dozen teenagers watched and did nothing, Newsweek online reported that, "a small but growing group of educators is trying to bring what's called 'bystander education' to American schools. While sexual violence prevention programs have typically focused on the victim (discouraging women from walking alone at night, for example) or the perpetrator (reiterating the fact that no means no), the bystander approach emphasizes the role witnesses can play in either supporting or challenging violence."

Katz and his colleagues developed one of the first bystander initiatives, the mixed-gender Mentors in Violence Prevention (MVP) program, in 1993 at Northeastern University's Center for the Study of Sport in Society.  “Most people think they only have two choices for intervention,” says Katz. “One is to intervene physically right at the point of attack, and the other is to do nothing. And that’s a false set of choices.” As part of the MVP program, students sit in a classroom and talk about the menu of options—from getting a group of friends together to calling 911—available to them. At the heart of the program is a set of scenarios that allow students to imagine what they might do in a variety of situations. Each scenario comes with a list of viable interventions for bystanders.

According to Newsweek, research is still needed to determine the effectiveness of bystander-awareness programs in schools, but the initial results are promising. One study found that after the Sioux City School District in Iowa implemented the MVP program, the number of freshman boys who said they could help prevent violence against women and girls increased by 50 percent.

The bystander programs that have proliferated in recent years on college and high school campuses and in the U.S. military involve both sexes and draw from various violence prevention theories and educational practices.  The MVP model was influenced by basic tenets of social justice education.   This approach is partly based on the premise that men's silence in the face of other men's abusive or violent behavior gives "implicit consent" to such behavior.

The MVP bystander approach frames men's abuse of women as a societal problem whose roots lie in the institutional structures and cultural practices of a male-dominated society. [24]  Thus, the MVP approach emphasizes changing social norms as the key to prevention. By challenging men to speak up and “[change] group dynamics in male peer culture,”this bystander model empowers men to step outside of the victim/perpetrator binary and gives men an opportunity to talk about some of the “dynamics of their interpersonal and group interaction in a safe space.”

Mentors in Violence Prevention (MVP) Model
Katz presented the Mentors in Violence Prevention (MVP) model hoping to put the focus on men to discontinue trends of violent masculinity through creating a model that would invite men into the critical dialogue, instead of painting them as perpetrators or potential perpetrators. Katz realized that there was a frustrating lack of inclusion of men and boys in the gender violence discussion, prompting him to create an education model that was inclusive to men and boys.

The original MVP model was created as workshops for all-male student athletes; Katz hoped that by working with male student athletes, they could help to stop the spread of ‘rape-supportive’ and ‘battering-supportive’ attitudes by speaking out against the masculine binary that supports gender violence. (Recon, 166) Katz says his initial focus on working with student-athletes stems from the “apathy, defensiveness—and sometimes outright hostility—of male athletic directors, coaches, and student-athletes...men and young men in the…athletic subculture…typically occupy a privileged position in school culture, and particularly in male peer culture.”  This is a step towards the bystander approach. By working with boys who typically represented the popular part of school culture, Katz was hoping that these boys would then influence the people around them and in their schools in similar manners. It was important for Katz to ensure that MVP considers male student-athletes as potential mentors for younger kids, able of providing male leadership necessary to stop gender abuse.

Katz's model generally revolves around simulation and role-playing, as well as large discussion-based group meetings both consisting same-sex and different-sex students.  As a part of his college initiative, his MVP model involves “holding three 90-minute sessions each year with each participating college team. A fourth session is scheduled for those student-athletes who wish to be trained further for work with younger students in middle and high school.”  These workshops are designed to provide spaces for boys to discuss with each other the concept of masculinity and its definition, as well as its relation to  gender abuse and violence. Additionally, Katz recognizes the role of those in positions of authority in schools and athletic teams. As his program has grown and evolved, he has included training of selected male and professional staff working in all sectors of schools and colleges.) In this, he is hoping that the top-down approach will provide role models for young and impressionable students and athletes who are looking for good representation. If these school leaders are able to use their positions of authority as positions of good influence, it will perhaps encourage a change in paradigm that will affect all of those in the school or community.

The MVP model originally focused on just male student-athletes. Since, the MVP model has expanded its target audience and educational group to “boys and girls, men and women, working together and in single-sex formats…by the mid-1990s MVP had moved from a near-exclusive focus on the athletic world to general populations of high school and college students, and other institutional settings.”  This expansion means that the dialogue around gender abuse and gender binaries is spreading throughout schools across the nation. More frank and honest talk about gender abuse will not only remove many of the stigmas from those who are abused, but will also encourage students to act out and speak out in defense of themselves and each other.

Media literacy and masculinities
In his writings, public lectures, and films, Katz argues that gendered understandings and behavior in every arena from interpersonal relationships to the workplace and even politics are influenced by media and popular culture. Focusing on normative portrayals of men in advertising, television, Hollywood films, the entertainment industries, sports, and politics, Katz calls for an examination of "the poses we strike and the images of masculinity that proliferate in media culture" as a way to "illuminate... what's going on in individual men's lives, and in our culture as a whole."

Katz further maintains that in spite of variability due to such categories as class, race and ethnicity, "violence in America is overwhelmingly a gendered phenomenon," shaped by "cultural codes and ideals of masculinity and manhood." He argues that "masculinity" and "femininity" are socially constructed categories, and thus the "disturbing equation of masculinity with pathological control and violence" that currently exists in America is not genetically predetermined and can be changed. In the "Tough Guise" study guide, co-written with the video producer Jeremy Earp of the Media Education Foundation, Katz underscores his motivation for promoting media literacy: "By looking critically at how institutions – from media outlets to political institutions to our schools – often play a role in reinforcing constricted, regressive notions of manhood that maintain an unacceptably violent status quo, we might begin to clear some space for individuals, male and female, to live freer lives."

Presidential masculinities
Katz's work on images of masculinity in media extends to his examination of "a crucial but barely explored topic of cultural studies analysis: the role of media culture in the construction of presidential masculinity."  Katz posits that "media have become the single most important source of political information and persuasion," and that "education for democracy in this era requires citizens to be media literate."

According to Katz, part of being politically media literate means understanding how gender functions as a sub-textual force in presidential politics. He asks questions such as "how does the perceived 'manliness' or 'toughness' of political candidates affect their electoral success? To what degree is the gender gap in presidential politics affected by men's gendered identities and sense of themselves as men, which itself is reinforced by media discourses and portrayals? How does paid political advertising on television – by far the biggest expenditure of funds in presidential campaigns – shape voters' perceptions of the relative 'manliness' of candidates? What are the similarities and differences between how women and men ascertain whether male political figures measure up to the 'masculine ideal' that is circulating in media culture at a given historical moment? Which mediated (white) masculine styles or archetypes have been politically successful over the past fifty years, and why?"

In an article about the Barack Obama-Hillary Clinton race for the Democratic presidential nomination in 2008, Katz responded to pundits and other political observers who decried the media focus on race and gender when other crucial issues loomed. "Presidential elections are always about race and gender. The reason people are talking about them now is that a black man and a (white) woman are serious contenders for a major party nomination. Their success is making visible what historically has been hidden in plain sight."

"Campaigns for the U.S. presidency in the era of mass media," he wrote, "always turn on the personality and style of candidates, their skills at televisual performance, their race and gender, and how all of these interact with questions of national identity at a given historical moment. The biggest difference this time is that the Democratic nominee will not embody and hence reinforce the dominant position of white masculinity in the race/gender system."

Katz further maintained that, "Presidential contests until now have been contests between men. Men were the gender that mattered. No matter how qualified by intelligence, leadership ability or experience, women were not seriously considered for the top job in government, and everyone knew it. Their gender prevented people from seeing them as 'presidential.' If there is one thing that truly represents 'change' in this historic election season it is the change in what it means to appear 'presidential.'   In the past, whether a candidate was a Republican or Democrat, conservative, centrist or liberal, their race and gender were predetermined. They were inevitably – and invariably – white and a man.”

For Katz, violence also plays an important role in shaping political discourse and in the voters' choice of whom to support for president. "How much of the white male vote is determined by impressions about the relative 'manliness' or 'toughness' of candidates or political parties hasn’t been quantified," Katz writes. "But there is no doubt that for several decades violence—both our individual and collective vulnerability to it, and questions about when and how to use the violent power of the state to protect the 'national interest' — has been an ominous and omnipresent factor in numerous foreign policy and domestic political issues (e.g. the Cold War, Vietnam, the 'War on Terror,' and the invasion of Iraq, as well as gun control, and executive, legislative and judicial responses to violent crime)."

In several articles, Katz analyzes and comments on "the pervasive use of sports metaphors in presidential discourse and how the language of sport functions to construct a masculine ideal for leadership at the heights of political power." He points out that "the two most 'metaphorically influential' sports in presidential campaign rhetoric are boxing and football... not coincidentally, both are violent sports that attract a disproportionate percentage of male participants and fans."

"The frequent use of boxing and football metaphors in political discourse did not cause violence to become an important force in our politics, but this usage is one measure of how presidential campaigns in the mass media era are less about policy differences and complex political agendas than they are about the selling of a certain kind of executive masculinity, embodied until the historic 2008 election in a particular white man whom the public comes to know largely through television and other technologies of mass communication."

Katz also comments on implications for female candidates. He writes, "One of 2008 Republican vice-presidential nominee Sarah Palin's most-quoted lines on the campaign trail in the fall of 2008 was 'The heels are on, the gloves are off,' which she typically delivered to wild cheers of approval. In coming years, when this historic campaign and those yet to come are analyzed, it will be particularly interesting to see how female and male voters respond to language where a woman throws the 'knockout punch.' Does this masculinize and thus help to make them more credible as potential commanders-in-chief? Or do women who are seen as 'too-aggressive' – even if only in a metaphorical sense – turn voters off? What are the differences between how the sexes view a woman 'throwing punches' if she's a conservative (like Palin) or a liberal feminist (like Hillary Clinton?)."

Documentaries
Katz is the creator of educational videos for high school and college students produced and distributed through the Media Education Foundation:

 Tough Guise: Men, Violence and the Crisis in Masculinity (1999) (with Sut Jhally). The video was named one of the Top Ten Young Adult Videos for 2000 by the American Library Association.
 Wrestling with Manhood: Boys, Bullying & Battering (2002) (with Sut Jhally). The video analyzes the gender and sexual politics of professional wrestling.
 Spin the Bottle: Sex, Lies, and Alcohol (2004) (with Jean Kilbourne). The video examines media representations of gender and sexuality in beer commercials, Hollywood films and other media.
Tough Guise 2: Violence, Manhood & American Culture The video examines toxic masculinity and masculine violence.

He is also featured in such documentaries as Byron Hurt's Hip Hop: Beyond Beats and Rhymes (2007), Thomas Keith's Generation M: Misogyny in Media & Culture (2008), and Jennifer Siebel Newsom's Miss Representation (2011).

Writings
Katz publishes articles in academic journals, anthologies, and text readers on topics such as the intersections of race and gender in the representation of masculinity, advertising, secondary educational leadership, right-wing talk radio, Mel Gibson, athletes and gender violence, media discourse about violence, masculinities and violence, presidential masculinities, and Jewish masculinity.

Katz's book, The Macho Paradox: Why Some Men Hurt Women and How All Men Can Help, (2006),
 , was published by Sourcebooks in 2006. Another book, Man Enough? Donald Trump, Hillary Clinton, and the Politics of Presidential Masculinity  was released in paperback on March 15, 2016.

Katz currently blogs for the Huffington Post.

References

Bibliography

External links
Jackson Katz's official website
“10 Things Men Can Do to Prevent Gender Violence”
Defense Task Force on Domestic Violence 2001 Report
Defense Task Force on Domestic Violence 2002 Report
Defense Task Force on Domestic Violence 2003 Report

Jackson Katz at The Huffington Post
Mentors In Violence Prevention (MVP) at the Center for the Study of Sport in Society at Northeastern University
Article from US1 newspaper dated 12/3/2008
Violence & Silence: Jackson Katz at TEDxFiDiWomen

1960 births
Harvard Graduate School of Education alumni
People from Swampscott, Massachusetts
Social constructionism
University of Massachusetts Amherst alumni
UCLA Graduate School of Education and Information Studies alumni
Film producers from Massachusetts
Living people
Male feminists
HuffPost writers and columnists